Rubabikia (translit: Robabikya), is a 1967 Egyptian comedy play, starring Salah Zulfikar, Taheyya Kariokka and Nabila Ebeid. It is written and directed by Fayez Halawa.

The play shows the corruption in cultural life and in the media, and how much this can create a myth out of a lie.

Synopsis 
A junior writer (Salah Zulfikar) buys some papers containing a novel from a second hand seller of Rubabikia (Taheyya Kariokka) and puts his name on it, and the deviant propaganda tool undertakes the necessary propaganda work, stating that the novel "Clover is Calling You Green" is the pinnacle of the literary work. A fake actress (Nabila Ebeid), all of her qualifications are her beauty granted to the producers and directors, stars in it, and then its real unknown author, Muhammad Al-Hayyun (Waheed Saif), appears. Some ironies happen.

Cast 

 Salah Zulfikar
 Taheyya Kariokka
 Nabila Ebeid
 Fayez Halawa
 Waheed Saif
 Badr Al-Din Jamjoom
 Hassan Hussein
 Samia Mohsen
 Saif Allah Mukhtar

References

External links 

 
 Rubabikia on elCinema

Egyptian plays
1967 plays
Arabic-language plays